Shwayder is a surname. Notable people with the surname include:

Jesse Shwayder (1882–1970), American businessman, founder of the Samsonite Corporation
Ryan Shwayder, American video game designer